Meadow Lake is a census-designated place (CDP) in Valencia County, New Mexico, United States. The population was 4,491 at the 2000 census. It is part of the Albuquerque Metropolitan Statistical Area.

Geography
Meadow Lake is located at  (34.803959, -106.579522).

Demographics

As of the census of 2000, there were 4,491 people, 1,339 households, and 1,084 families residing in the CDP. The population density was 465.3 people per square mile (179.7/km2). There were 1,543 housing units at an average density of 159.9 per square mile (61.7/km2). The racial makeup of the CDP was 54.02% White, 1.27% African American, 4.07% Native American, 0.36% Asian, 0.07% Pacific Islander, 33.60% from other races, and 6.61% from two or more races. Hispanic or Latino of any race were 57.89% of the population.

There were 1,339 households, out of which 53.7% had children under the age of 18 living with them, 55.9% were married couples living together, 16.5% had a female householder with no husband present, and 19.0% were non-families. 13.5% of all households were made up of individuals, and 3.4% had someone living alone who was 65 years of age or older. The average household size was 3.35 and the average family size was 3.67.

In the CDP, the population was spread out, with 38.1% under the age of 18, 8.7% from 18 to 24, 33.2% from 25 to 44, 15.7% from 45 to 64, and 4.4% who were 65 years of age or older. The median age was 27 years. For every 100 females, there were 99.9 males. For every 100 females age 18 and over, there were 98.2 males.

The median income for a household in the CDP was $25,561, and the median income for a family was $27,296. Males had a median income of $23,598 versus $20,469 for females. The per capita income for the CDP was $10,808. About 21.9% of families and 24.4% of the population were below the poverty line, including 30.6% of those under age 18 and 21.3% of those age 65 or over.

Education
The community's public schools are operated by Los Lunas Schools.

References

External links
 Meadow Lake Parks Area Association

Census-designated places in New Mexico
Census-designated places in Valencia County, New Mexico
Albuquerque metropolitan area